St Mary and St John's Church, Hardraw (also Hardrow) is a Grade II listed parish church in the Church of England in Hardraw, North Yorkshire.

History

The church was built in 1879 - 1880 to designs by the architect Richard Herbert Carpenter and paid for by Edward Montagu-Stuart-Wortley-Mackenzie, 1st Earl of Wharncliffe as a memorial to his brother, the Hon. James Frederick Stuart-Wortley. It was consecrated by the Bishop of Ripon Rt. Revd. Robert Bickersteth on 20 July 1880.

It achieved popular recognition when it was featured as Darrowby Church in the British television series All Creatures Great and Small.

Parish status
The church is in a joint parish with
St Oswald's Church, Askrigg
St Margaret's Church, Hawes
St Matthew's Church, Stalling Busk

Organ
A pipe organ was built by the Vincent Electric Organ company and originally installed in West Witton Methodist Church .A specification of the organ can be found on the National Pipe Organ Register.

References

Church of England church buildings in North Yorkshire
Grade II listed churches in North Yorkshire